Yato is one of three villages on the island of Wale in the Pukapuka atoll of the Cook Islands. It is the westernmost village and regulates the island of Motu Kotawa and the sand cay of Toka.

Niua School is located in the village.

References

Pukapuka
Populated places in the Cook Islands